Jirawat Thongsaengphrao (born 31 March 1998) is a Thai professional footballer who plays as a left back for Thai League 1 club Ratchaburi Mitr Phol.

References

1998 births
Living people
Jirawat Thongsaengphrao
Jirawat Thongsaengphrao
Association football defenders
Jirawat Thongsaengphrao
Jirawat Thongsaengphrao
Jirawat Thongsaengphrao
Jirawat Thongsaengphrao